Dominique Giovanni "Nic" Wise (born September 8, 1987) is an American professional basketball player who last played for KB Peja of the Siguria Superleague.

High school

At Kingwood High School, Nic Wise was a two-year letterwinner.  He played his freshmen Highschool year at Cinco Ranch in Katy.  The following year, he played under his father at Hightower Highschool.  His highschool junior year he then went to Westfield Highschool and quickly left when playing time may be in question.  He then transferred to Kingwood High School and finished his career with a record of 131–23 (.851)—the most wins by any player in Texas Class 5A history. He averaged 19.0 points, 8.0 assists, 6.0 rebounds, and 4.0 steals per contest. Wise led Kingwood to the Texas Class 5A State Championship game in two straight years, which resulted in a state title to finish his junior year by defeating DeSoto High School, and a loss in his senior year in an overtime game to Plano Senior High School. He was ranked the 26th best high school prospect and the 4th best point guard in the nation by Bob Gibbons's All-Star sports Top 100.

Collegiate career
Nic Wise played four years for the Arizona Wildcats. During his junior year, Wise was named to the All-Pac-10 Second Team. In his senior campaign, Wise was selected to the All-Pac-10 First Team and the NABC All District 20 Team.

Professional career
In July 2010, Wise was signed by the Telekom Baskets Bonn of Germany for the 2010–11 season.

In August 2011 he signed a one-year deal with STB Le Havre of the LNB Pro A.

On July 12, 2012, he signed with Juvecaserta Basket of Italy. On October 16, 2012, he parted ways with Juvecaserta after playing only three games in Serie A. In January 2013, he signed with Rosa Radom of the Polish Basketball League for the rest of the 2012–13 season.

In August 2013, he signed with Akhisar Belediye of the Turkish Basketball Second League.

On March 1, 2015, he signed with KB Peja of the Siguria Superleague.

NCAA career statistics 

|-
| align="left" | 2006-07
| align="left" | Arizona
| 22 || ... || 8.2 || .255 || .233 || .688 || .5 || .5 || .3 || 0.0 || 1.9
|-
| align="left" | 2007-08
| align="left" | Arizona
| 27 || ... || 29.4 || .451 || .481 || .768 || 2.3 || 4.4 || 2.0 || 0.1 || 9.2
|-
| align="left" | 2008-09
| align="left" | Arizona
| 35 || ... || 36.4 || .452 || .415 || . 848 || 2.5 || 4.6 || 1.5 || 0.1 || 15.7
|-
| align="left" | 2009-10
| align="left" | Arizona
| 31 || ... || 32.9 || .386 || .360 || .878 || 3.3 || 3.3 || 1.7 || 0.1 || 14.4

Source:

References

External links
 Eurobasket.com Profile
 FIBA.com Profile

1987 births
Living people
American expatriate basketball people in France
American expatriate basketball people in Germany
American expatriate basketball people in Italy
American expatriate basketball people in Kosovo
American expatriate basketball people in Turkey
American men's basketball players
Arizona Wildcats men's basketball players
Basketball players from Houston
İstanbul Teknik Üniversitesi B.K. players
Juvecaserta Basket players
KB Peja players
Point guards
Rosa Radom players
STB Le Havre players
Telekom Baskets Bonn players